Seánie Furlong is a Gaelic footballer from County Wicklow, Ireland. He plays Gaelic football with his local club Kiltegan and has been a member of the Wicklow. 
Furlong made his senior championship debut against Kildare which turned out to be the County's first win in a Leinster championship at Croke Park. In 2012 he won Man of the Match as Wicklow overcame Fermanagh to take the Div 4 National League title scoring 1-05 of his side's title.

References

External links
 

1988 births
Living people
Date of birth missing (living people)
Wicklow inter-county Gaelic footballers